Point Whidbey is a headland located at the southern western extremity of both Coffin Bay Peninsula and Avoid Bay on the west coast of Eyre Peninsula in South Australia about  west of the town of Coffin Bay. The point is currently located within the boundaries of the protected area, the Coffin Bay National Park.

References

Headlands of South Australia
Eyre Peninsula
Great Australian Bight